This is a list of current and former Roman Catholic churches in the Roman Catholic Archdiocese of Baltimore.  The archdiocese covers Baltimore and nine counties in central and western Maryland: Allegany, Anne Arundel, Baltimore, Carroll, Frederick, Garrett, Harford, Howard, and Washington.

The cathedral church of the archdiocese is the Cathedral of Mary Our Queen, consecrated in Baltimore in 1959. The archdiocese also includes the Basilica of the National Shrine of the Assumption of the Blessed Virgin Mary, built in Baltimore between 1806 and 1863, based on a design by Benjamin Henry Latrobe.

As the home to the first American-born saint, Elizabeth Ann Seton, the archdiocese also includes several sites associated with her life and works the National Shrine of St. Elizabeth Ann Seton (Seton's tomb located in the basilica), the lower chapel at St. Mary's Seminary where Seton gave her vows of chastity and poverty in 1808; and the Mother Seton House where she lived from 1808 to 1809.

Baltimore

Active

Former

Outside Baltimore

References

Baltimore